Netherworld is a 1992 American horror film written and directed by David Schmoeller and produced by Charles Band.

Synopsis
After his father dies, Corey Thorton inherits his father's estate in Louisiana, only to find that his father plans to sacrifice his soul to live again.

Cast
 Michael Bendetti as Corey Thorton
 Denise Gentile as Delores
 Holly Floria as Diane Palmer
 Robert Sampson as Noah Thorton
 Holly Butler as Marilyn Monroe
 Alex Datcher as Mary Magdalene
 Robert Burr as Beauregard Yates, Esq.
 George Kelly as Bijou
 Mark Kemble as Barbusoir
 Michael Lowry as Stemsy
 David Schmoeller as Billy C.

Production
The film was originally to be produced in Romania, but Band moved it to New Orleans, Louisiana.

Reception
Writing in The Zombie Movie Encyclopedia, academic Peter Dendle called it "an unremarkble Dixieland shocker from dubious Full Moon studios".  Lawrence Cohn of Variety called it an "entertaining horror pic".

References

External links

1992 films
1992 horror films
American zombie films
1990s French-language films
American erotic horror films
American erotic romance films
Films set in country houses
Films set in New Orleans
Films shot in New Orleans
Films directed by David Schmoeller
Films with screenplays by David Schmoeller
1990s English-language films
1990s American films